The Pennsylvania Military Museum is a museum dedicated to the military history of Pennsylvania. The Museum is located in the village of Boalsburg, Centre County, Pennsylvania in the central part of the state.

Museum and shrine history 
At the height of the Vietnam War in the winter of 1967-68, a museum dedicated to the citizen-soldiers of the Commonwealth was being constructed in Boalsburg, Centre County. Situated on the grounds of the Pennsylvania National Guard's 28th Infantry Division Shrine, this construction project was the final goal in a 48-year quest.

The location of the Shrine and future museum was part of the Theodore Davis Boal estate. Boal, a wealthy landowner and prominent citizen of the Centre Region, established a privately funded machine gun company on his land for service with the Pennsylvania National Guard in World War One. Shortly after the return of the division in 1919, at an officer's club reunion at his estate, Boal dedicated a memorial to the fallen troopers in the machine gun company. This simple ceremony during the first reunion of the men of the Society of the 28th Division American Expeditionary Force (A.E.F.) established what was to be known as the 28th Infantry Division National Shrine.  It was also in this same year that Boal was reported to have shipped back from war-torn France a number of relics removed from the battlefield for eventual display in a museum to be located on his property.

Relics, weapons and souvenirs were brought back from the Great War for display in the Society Officers Club that was built on the land. The site was sold to the Commonwealth in 1931 and remained an active military cavalry post within the Department of Military Affairs up through the mid-1930s. Reunions of the Society A.E.F. were still held each year and monuments continued to be dedicated.

By 1936 the needs of the U.S. Army and Pennsylvania National Guard dictated that the Boalsburg post was no longer viable. The troop was disbanded in May of that year. However, the shrine continued to grow as the annual reunions were still held and the Society Officers Club facilities hosted the attendees. Yet, by April 1938, the continuing economic depression and passing away of the "old guard" of officers from the Great War forced the dissolution of the Officers Club.  Theodore Davis Boal died four months later at the age of 71. Even though the presence of the club on the property was no more, the Society continued to exist as a fraternal veteran's organization with statewide posts in every region.

Discussion about the construction of a military museum has been recorded in the Society's convention meetings throughout the 1920s, 30s and 40s. It had remained very much on the minds of veterans, yet the Depression and World War Two postponed any serious lobbying for funding. It wasn't until the late 1950s that the political climate in Harrisburg was favorable to the idea. On July 8, 1957, custody of the shrine and its grounds was given to the Pennsylvania Historical and Museum Commission. This initiative resulted from the interest within the Society of the 28th Division A.E.F. led by Director William A. Miller. Two important figures in state service collaborated on the project. Camp Hill native Major General Henry K. Fluck, commander of the 28th Infantry Division and former State College resident, and Executive Director of the commission, S.K. Stevens, joined together to follow through on an agenda that included the long-term goal of constructing a museum at the site of the shrine.

Despite some false starts with highly publicized ground breaking ceremonies in 1963, 1964, and 1965, actual construction began in the fall of 1967. The structure was placed on a hill overlooking the parade grounds of the shrine. The building itself was meant to convey the impression of a defensive military position, and that look was certainly captured by the architectural design firm of Heyl, Treby Associates of Allentown. The exhibits retained the WWI focus then exemplified by the 28th Division Shrine.

The first site administrator for the new Pennsylvania Military Museum was Mr. Donald Morrison of Mechanicsburg. A trench scene included in this first interpretation of Pennsylvania military history consisted of an 80 ft. section of a WWI trench that was fabricated complete with dugouts, bunkers, barbed wire, and vehicles. Although not historically accurate, this "environmental exhibit" as it was called at that time was billed as one of the first in the country and offered visitors the opportunity to immerse themselves in a life-size diorama complete with battle sounds. The Military Museum was completed at a cost of $252,695 and officially opened to the public on Sunday, May 25, 1969.

Throughout the 1970s and 80s, the Museum told the story of our nation's conflicts through the eyes of the citizen soldiers of the National Guard. Tens of thousands of school children and adults toured the "trench", viewed the exhibits, and attended special events. Don Morrison retired in 1990 and administration of the site was given to Mr. William J. Leech of Pittsburgh. Under this new stewardship the Museum experienced a public revival. A museum advocacy support group, The Friends of the Pennsylvania Military Museum, was organized in 1991, and the interpretive theme of the service veteran was renewed to include all service branches and more current conflicts up to and including Desert Storm.

In 1999, former Lt. Governor Mark Schweiker announced the authorization of state funding to completely renovate the Museum. The original 1967-68 structure did not allow for the proper storage of collections or administrative growth. A number of studies and focus groups convened in the 1990s supported this need for an architectural, landscape, and interpretive theme makeover. A floor-to-ceiling and wall-to-wall re-design more in accordance with accepted museum standards began in the fall of 2003. One of the more striking changes is the front facade. Whereas the old "bunker" design was an imposing feature, the new front invites people to come for a closer look. The innovative military ribbon design by Purdy O'Gwynn Barnhart Architects, Inc., has won an award by the American Institute of Architects. Known as the "Wall of Honor", the front facade of the Pennsylvania Military Museum is decorated with representations of several military service ribbons that have been awarded to Commonwealth veterans throughout the last century.

In 1995, funding was released to completely renovate the shrine area around the World War One Officers Memory Wall. A second memorial wall listing all known division casualties in World War Two was planned into the landscaped terrain of the existing memorial wall. In January 1997, sixty years after the first monuments were laid out on the grounds, the major components of the 28th Infantry Division Shrine were renovated. More than $800,000 was allotted to rebuild the shrine proper and add a memory wall with the division's World War Two casualties.

Construction on the building was completed in the winter of 2005. Temporary exhibits interpreting the tactics and logistics of warfare opened the Museum in July 2005. Outdoor kiosks and signage interpreting the history of the Museum & Historic Site and static displays, designed the previous year, were constructed at this time. By the end of the year, the Museum would feature a new interior/exterior structure design, new interior/exterior exhibits, re-designed landscape terrain, new pedestrian bridge and renovated access roadway/walking paths offering a better physical connection from the parking lot to the Museum and Shrine. New educational interpretive tools such as a professionally mastered DVD and guidebook continue to offer a vision of the Museum as interpreting the 20th century history of all Commonwealth citizens who had served in the armed forces. A $4.2 million Capital Project for permanent exhibits is currently awaiting release. Interpretive planning to better tell the story of the Commonwealth citizen soldier, sailor, airman, and Marine in the 20th and 21st centuries is currently underway.

Monuments and Shrine 
Through an agreed upon S.O.P. (Standard Operating Procedure) between the Pennsylvania Historical Museum & Commission and the Division Commander of the 28th Infantry Division, the installation of monuments and memorials is coordinated.  This S.O.P. states, "Only units of company size or larger from within the 28th Infantry Division past and present will be considered for enshrinement at the 28TH Infantry Division Shrine in Boalsburg. This will include Units of Company size or larger built specifically for mobilization. Memorials will represent recognized conflicts of the United States Department of Defense."

The monuments and memorials at the Pennsylvania Military Museum currently include:
 109TH FIELD ARTILLERY TRAIN WRECK MEMORIAL, Dedicated May 23, 1971. This monument remembers the 33 men of the Greater Wilkes-Barre 109th Field Artillery who lost their lives while en route to Camp Atterbury, Indiana. On September 11, 1950, the 109th's train stopped along the tracks near Coshoton, Ohio while a broken air hose was being fixed. Without warning, a passenger train crashed into the rear of the train.
 2ND BRIGADE COMBAT TEAM, Dedicated May 30, 2012. Honors the 82 Marines, Soldiers, and Sailors from the 2nd Brigade Combat Team, 28th Inf. Div., who were killed in combat during Operation Iraqi Freedom from June 2005 – 2006. The memorial, constructed of granite and steel, is modeled after the original monument built by soldiers in Iraq that was disassembled and brought back to Fort Indiantown Gap. Inside, dog tags from each fallen warrior are suspended above a wind chime, creating a subtle sound whenever the wind passes.
 28TH SIGNAL BATTALION, Dedicated May 15, 2009.  Dedicated to honor the men and women of the 28th Signal Battalion and the lineage organizations of the 103rd Field Signal Battalion and 28th Signal Company. All have served since 1908.
 KOREAN CALL UP MONUMENT, Dedicated May 16, 2010.  Commemorates the 28th Inf. Div.'s soldiers of the Korean War Call-Up who served as part of NATO's forces in Germany, as well as those deployed to Korea in 1951 as part of U.S. opposition to the Soviet Union's involvement with the invasion of South Korea in the Cold War.
 28TH DIVISION GLOBAL WAR ON TERROR MONUMENT, Dedicated May 22, 2016.  Erected by members of the 28th Infantry Division in memory of their fallen comrades, this monument recognizes soldiers of the 28th Div. who gave their lives in the fight against the Global War on Terrorism.
 BAZOOKA BOOGIE MONUMENT, Dedicated May 16, 2010.  Honors members of the 28th Inf. Div. Band who assisted in the defense of Wiltz, Luxemburg, in 1944. This monument is a replica of a stone on solemn ground in Wiltz.
 109TH INFANTRY MEMORIAL, Dedicated May 23, 1954.  Commemorates those who served with the 109th Infantry Div. throughout its history, from the Washington Grays, a volunteer regiment formed in 1822, to WWII.
 110TH INFANTRY MEMORIAL, Dedicated May 22, 1955.  Commemorates those who served with the 110th in WWI and II. Each bench is inscribed with the name of a battle that the 110th fought in during the World Wars.
 107TH FIELD ARTILLERY MEMORIAL, Dedicated May 16, 1948.  Erected by the Veterans Association of the 107th Field Artillery in memory of the "faithful sons of Pennsylvania who served this regiment",  this monument lists names of more than 2,400 men in the 107th in WWI. An artillery shell, placed atop the monument, represents perpetual light.
 111TH INFANTRY MEMORIAL, Dedicated May 22, 1955.  The 111th Infantry, headquartered in Philadelphia, began as members of the "Associators", founded by Benjamin Franklin in 1747 during King George's War. This memorial honors all who served from the Associators through WWII.
 108TH FIELD ARTILLERY MEMORIAL, Dedicated May 24, 1953.  This recognizes the service of the 108th Field Artillery. The coat of arms of the 108th includes a diamond, circle, and Maltese cross, all which indicate service in the Army of the Potomac. The keystone represents service in France during WWI. The lion is part of the coat of arms of Belgium, used here because of the regiment's service as part of the 53rd Field Artillery Brigade under command of Albert, King of Belgium. The unit's motto means "Not Self, But Country".
 112TH INFANTRY MEMORIAL, Dedicated May 27, 1956.  This unit served in the Civil War, Spanish–American War, Mexican Border Campaign, both World Wars and NATO. It was instrumental in stopping the final offensive of the German Army in WWI. Completed in 1956, the 112th was the last of the major units of WWI to dedicate a memorial.
 WALLACE W. FETZER MEMORIAL, Dedicated 1926.  Fetzer, a battalion commander of the 110th Infantry Regiment, was killed instantly when Regimental Headquarters was blown up on July 28, 1918, near Fresnes, France. Fetzer was highly regarded, as it was recorded that "few soldiers have ever so favorably impressed the regiment in so short a time as Colonel Fetzer".
 109TH INFANTRY FIELD ARTILLERY MEMORIAL.  Erected by members of the 109th, this honors the enlisted dead of the 109th Field Artillery, commanded by Gen. Asher Miner, who served in WWI.
 GENERAL ASHER MINER MEMORIAL, Dedicated September 9, 1924.  This memorial honors Gen. Asher Miner, who served in the 109th Field Artillery from Wilkes-Barre. On Oct. 4, 1918, Miner advanced his position behind infantry where he was heavily shelled. He received a severe wound that later necessitated the amputation of his leg. Asher received the Distinguished Service Cross and Distinguished Service Medal, and after WWI, he was made Brigadier General as commander of the 53rd Artillery Brigade. He retired from service as a Major General and died Sept. 2, 1924.
 BRIGADIER GENERAL EDWARD SIGERFOOS MEMORIAL, Dedicated September 9, 1924.  Sigerfoos commanded the 28th Div's 56th Brigade for 1 hour when he was killed in Montblainville, France. He was the only general officer to be killed in combat in France. Atop the monument is the wayside cross near which Sigerfoos died, a gift from the citizens of Montblainville.
 MAJOR THOMAS B. ANDERSON MEMORIAL, Dedicated October 4, 1925.  Major Anderson, Spanish–American War veteran and leader of the 110th Inf., was killed on Sept. 5, 1918 while leading a charge against a German machine gun nest. He received a Regimental citation and Distinguished Service Cross.
 1ST LIEUTENANT HENRY LAMI MEMORIAL.  Lt. Lami served as a French Liaison Officer and interpreter within the 110th Infantry. On Sept. 6, 1918, he was gassed in action during the taking of Baslieux. He died after refusing to retreat, suffering the heaviest poison attack ever endured by the 110th. The monument was donated by veterans of the 110th Infantry.
 103RD MEDICAL BATTALION MEMORIAL, Dedicated May 24, 1964.  The insignia of the 103rd traces the unit's history from its organization in 1916. Their first service, the Mexican Border Campaign, is represented by the cactus. The chevron represents the Vesle River, while the broken wheel represents the 10 ambulances disabled while crossing the bridge over the Vesle. The bomb burst commemorates the bombing of the 112th Field Hospital in France.
 108TH MACHINE GUN BATTALION MEMORIAL, Dedicated May 27, 1962.  This monument honors the services of the 108th during WWI, whose campaigns included Champagne Marne, Aisne Marne, Oise Aisne, and Meuse Argonne.
 109TH MACHINE GUN BATTALION, Dedicated May 24, 1953.  This monument, funded by 109th veterans, lists names of the deceased of the 109th, including companies from Lancaster, Columbia, and Allentown. The 109th suffered heavy losses, particularly at Vesle, France, where 125 men were wounded, 12 killed, and 28 gassed. At Death Valley and Fismes, France, Company C reduced from 175 men to 83, necessitating a reorganization with men added from every state in the Union.
 LIEUTENANT COLONEL JAMES A. SHANNON MEMORIAL, Dedicated September 15, 1926.  Lt. Col. Shannon, commander of the 112th Infantry, was killed in action in the Meuse Argonne Campaign on Oct. 8, 1916. General Nolan, commander of the 55th Inf. Brigade, described Shannon as "calm and resourceful ... an inspiration to his officers and men."
 SHRINE TO COLONEL THEODORE D. BOAL, Dedicated September 15, 1940.  A memorial to Col. Boal, leader of the "Boal Troop", member of the 28th, and original owner of land for creation of the officer's club and shrine. When the wall of the shrine was built, veterans of the 28th left space for a shrine to Boal in the center of the wall for after his death in 1938.
 WORLD WAR I OFFICERS MEMORY WALL, Various plaques dedicated throughout 1920s, '30s, '40s.  This wall celebrates the services of 28th Div. officers who died in WWI. The wall's plaques are organized to represent the general positions of various units during the Battle of the Vesle River, represented by Spring Creek.
 WORLD WAR II MEMORY WALL, Dedicated September 14, 1997.  This wall commemorates the 28th Div. soldiers who were killed or died of wounds received during combat in WWII. All units shown (except the 111th that fought in the Pacific) served in Europe from July 1944 to the war's end.
 28TH DIVISION MEMORIAL, Dedicated May 23, 1953.  This monument, honoring the collective service of 28th Div. members and all Pennsylvanians, was donated by Edward C. Stegmaier, the National Commander of the Society of the 28th Div. in 1953.
 112TH MACHINE GUN BATTALION MEMORIAL, Dedicated May 21, 1954.  In memoriam of the men who served in the 112th in WWI, whose campaigns included Champagne, Champagne-Marne, Aisne-Marne, Oise-Aisne, Lorraine, and Meuse Argonne.
 HEADQUARTERS TROOP MEMORIAL, Dedicated May 23, 1954.  Based in Sunbury, PA, the Headquarters Troop served in WWI and acted in most of the 28th Div.'s major actions.
 103RD ENGINEERS MEMORIAL FOUNTAIN, Dedicated May 25, 1958.  This monument honors the service of the 103rd in WWI by representing one of a military engineer's most basic tasks: providing water.

World War 1 Officers Memorial Wall

There are 114 plaques on the World War 1 Memorial Wall of the 28th Division Shrine located at Boalsburg, PA.

1Lt Henry Howard HOUSTON II
  ADC Hqs, 53rd Field Artillery Brig 
Killed 18 August 1918 at Arcis-Le-Ponsart

The day he graduated from the University of Pennsylvania, Henry joined the Pennsylvania National Guard to serve at the U.S.-Mexican border during the U.S. punitive expedition against Pancho Villa in 1916. After leaving the border, he joined the Ambulance Corps in France. When the United States officially joined the war, Henry returned to America and trained with the U.S. Army.

He returned to France as an aerial observation officer. Lieutenant Houston II was killed in WW1 in Arcis-Le Ponsart, France on 18 Aug 1918 having volunteered to go to a position near the lines to give instructions regarding the proper liaison between the air forces and batteries.

He is memorialized by a plaque on the Pennsylvania 28th Division Shrine in Boalsburg, PA. A memorial and street are named in his honor in Arcis-Le Ponsart. He is buried at Suresnes American Cemetery (Plot B Row 16 Grave 28) in Paris.

Capt James E. ZUNDELL 

110th Infantry

Killed by a shell fragment on 30-Jul-18 at Courmont

Captain James E. Zundell, commander of Company E, a man who held the admiration of his superior officers and was loyally loved by his men, was hit by a shell fragment on July 29 and died in hospital on 110th InfantryCol. Theodore D. BOAL, D.S.CSacred to the Memory ofCol. Theodore D. BOAL, D.S.CHeadquarters 28th Division

Born:  June 24, 1867

Died:  August 22, 1938

Erected by his Friends, Officers of the

28th Division A.E.F.

1939

Capt	Edmund W. LYNCH (DSC)  111th InfantryKilled on 10-Aug-18 at Fismette, France

Captain Edmund Wright Lynch was posthumously presented with the Distinguished Service Cross (for extraordinary heroism in action while serving with 111th Infantry Regiment, 28th Division, A.E.F., at Fismette, France. Seeing two of his platoons being cut off by the enemy. Captain Lynch alone went to their rescue and engaged the enemy with his automatic pistol, killing several. He saved his platoons, but in so doing sacrificed his own life on 10 August 1918.

1Lt-Chaplin Michael W. KEITH

111th Infantry

Died of poison gas on 08-Sep-18 at St. Gilles – Fismette'

Dr. Michael Keith was an ordained minister.  He became the Chaplain for the 111 Infantry Regiment, 56 Infantry Brigade, 28 Infantry Division with the rank of First Lieutenant.

Arriving in France some 12 days later they were sent south of Saint-Omer to await the remainder of the division. On June 13 the division proceeded to the vicinity of Paris where it was attached to French troops for further training. For the next two months elements of the division were attached to various French and American divisions operating in the Chateau-Thierry Sector and participated in the Champagne-Marne Defensive and the Aisne-Marne Offensive. On August 7 the division as a whole relived the 32 Division and participated in the Oise-Aisne Offensive from August 18 to September 7, during which severe fighting was encountered. It was during this offensive that Chaplain Michael Wilson Keith lost his life due to German gas on September 8, 1918. There are several versions of the events that led to his death and some differences about the day he died.

Sergeant Major John J. Doran, Headquarters 111 Infantry Regiment gave this written account, February 20, 1919. “Chaplain Michael W. Keith was gassed in action, during a heavy shell fire, in a hollow on the St. Gilles-Fismes Road about a half mile southeast of Fismes on the night of September 6 and 7, 1918 and was evacuated to the hospital the morning of September 7, 1918. He died later at American Red Cross Hospital No. 3.”

Private William D. Wilson, 110th Ambulance Company:  "(German Artillery) started to shell a hollow where the infantry’s supply train was, under command of him, and that afternoon Maj. Iland had left for the big city. (The Germans) shelled the hollow and got 24 men, one killed and 23 hurt and Keith was asked to help dress these men for there was only one medical man and Harold had been sent to another place or he might have been gassed like Keith and the rest. The hollow was filled with gas and it was hard to work with the mask on, so Keith said to him men ‘For the lives of 23 men I will die to save them and will work without my mask on’. So Keith took his mask off and worked eight hours dressing these men and lived from Thursday, September 5 to September 10. This happened about 10:30 p.m. and he worked until 6 o’clock the next morning. Chap. Keith was gassed internally and his eyes were badly burned. When I saw him he looked at me and said ‘Wilson. Wilson Dorman Wilson, I know you. I am going to die’. He stared at me for a few minutes and said, ‘Let’s pray’, and I will never forget the prayer he uttered. It was the greatest prayer I ever heard and I don’t think a man exists that can make a prayer like he did. After his prayer he said to me ‘Give my regards and goodbye to Capt. Wagner and officers of this company; also Maj. Iland and the boys’. After which I took him to the hospital”.

Lt. Keith is buried at the new Suresnes American Cemetery and Memorial, Suresnes, Departement des Hauts-de-Seine, Île-de-France, France, Grave 24, Row 4, Plot B.

Lt. Charles H.FISKE III, 

111th Infantry

Killed on 24 August 1918 at Fismette, France

After attending Plattsburg Training Camp in July 1916, Fiske joined the American Ambulance Field Service. He was sent to Pont-a-Mousson and then went to Macedonia with the French Army. In understated diction, the memoirist of the Class of 1919 remarks: "That winter in the Balkans taught him the severities of serious warfare."

Fiske returned to Harvard in 1917 for the first part of his junior year. In January 1918, he left for officer's training camp, and in July he received his commission as second lieutenant and was ordered to Paris to join a combat division.  Seven days after his arrival at the front lines, he was severely wounded in a battle of the Oise-Aisne offensive.

USS Pennsylvania
 Built at the Newport News Navy Yard in Virginia and commissioned in 1916, the USS Pennsylvania (BB-38) was the lead ship of her Class of United States Navy "super dreadnought" battleships. During WWII, she participated in every major naval offensive in the Pacific, from Alaska to Okinawa. During WWII, she earned 8 battle stars and the US Navy Commendation Award for service.
After WWII, the "Pennsy" was used in two atomic bomb tests in July 1946. The ship was decommissioned in August 1946, but was kept at Kwajalein Lagoon for tests until February 1948. The Pennsy was found to have too much radiation and was not sea worthy. She was towed out to sea and sunk.
Two of the BB-38 guns, gun 22 (L3) and gun 28 (L2) were left on the ship during an overhaul in 1942 but were replaced in 1945. The guns were relined and sent to the gun barrel storage yard in Dahlgren, VA, where they remained for the past 50 years. They were "rediscovered" during a recent inventory, and the Museum acquired them for display in 2009.

Exterior Displays
This collection of artifacts is currently on static display outside of the Pennsylvania Military Museum.

•	M4A1(76)W Sherman Tank
•	M60A3 Tank
•	M42A1 Duster
•	M59 APC
•	M114A2 155mm Howitzer
•	4.5" Howitzer
•	BB-38 Guns

Education & Interpretation
The museum offers various types of tours, programs, and lectures year round allowing each visitor to have a unique experience dependent on when they visit. Education and Interpretation is designed to accommodate diverse crowds utilizing professional standards and best practices for museums and historic sites as prescribed by various organizations, including but not limited to the American Alliance of Museums, the American Association of State and Local History, and the National Park Service.
Programming is reviewed annually to ensure that curriculum standards and requirements are met (K-12). If field trips to the Pennsylvania Military Museum are not feasible, the museum operates a Visiting Educator Program. The Visiting Educator Program is coordinated via the Museum's education department. Through this program an educator visits the respective school-classroom for a fee offering an educational experience via presentation, materials, and artifacts.
Baccalaureate & Post-baccalaureate, Military Units, and related visitors can expect to have an experience guided by professional-staff based on existing tour options, and when able, customized tours, presentations, and focused studies.

Artifact Donation
The mission of the Pennsylvania Military Museum is to preserve and honor Pennsylvania's military history from 1747 to the present, interpreting for citizens and visitors the story of the Commonwealth's ‘Citizen Soldiers', civilian activities on the home front, and the contributions of Pennsylvania industry to military technology. Therefore, the Pennsylvania Military Museum collects artifacts relating directly to Pennsylvania's military history for exhibition in the Museum.
As a general rule, the Museum does not accept artifacts that are:

•	too large for storage or display
•	infested with insects, disease organisms, or other pests
•	in poor condition
•	newspapers
•	potentially hazardous items (e.g., live ammunition, unexploded ordnance)
•	duplicates of original artifacts

The Museum does not accept unsolicited artifacts through the mail. If you have objects that you are interested in donating to the Museum, please contact the Museum. 
Please have information readily available on the items, including their age, the conflict with which they are related to, their connection to Pennsylvania, and your contact information. Also, if possible, please have photographs of the artifact ready for submission.

Artifacts are only accepted as unrestricted gifts and if the owner wishes to place specific conditions upon their donation (e.g., display guarantees, terms of loan, etc.), they will not be accepted.

The Pennsylvania Military Museum uses artifacts for a variety of purposes, including exhibits organized and displayed in the Museum, for loans to other reputable institutions, and for research by students and historians. Artifacts not on exhibit or loan are placed in secure storage areas within the Museum. These areas have controlled humidity, temperature, and light to ensure that the items are carefully preserved.

References
1.	^ Pennsylvania Military Museum

External links
•	Official website

•	Pennsylvania Historical and Museum Commission

Coordinates:  40.7819°N 77.7953°W

References

Military and war museums in Pennsylvania
Museums in Centre County, Pennsylvania